Francisco I. Madero  is one of the 38 municipalities of Coahuila, in north-eastern Mexico. The municipal seat lies at Francisco I. Madero. The municipality covers an area of 4933.9 km².

As of 2005, the municipality had a total population of 51,528. In addition to the municipal seat, its largest other community is the town of Lequeitio.

References

Municipalities of Coahuila